Matagalpa Fútbol Club is a Nicaraguan football team playing in the second division of the Nicaragua football system. It is based in Matagalpa.

Achievements
Segunda División de Nicaragua: 1
2021-22

List of coaches
  Douglas El Pibe Urbina (Dec 2013 – Mar 2014)
  Denis Carrero (Mar 2014–)

See also 
 Segunda División de Nicaragua

References

External links
 

Football clubs in Nicaragua
Matagalpa